Monarthropalpus is a genus of gall midges in the family Cecidomyiidae. There is at least one described species in Monarthropalpus, M. flavus.

References

Further reading

 
 
 
 
 

Cecidomyiinae
Articles created by Qbugbot
Cecidomyiidae genera